Mechanicsville School is a former school building located in the Village of Mechanicsville neighborhood of Philadelphia, Pennsylvania. It was built in 1866–1867, and is a one-story, three-bay, vernacular stone building coated in stucco. It has a gable roof with wood cornice and brick chimney.

The building was added to the National Register of Historic Places in 1986. It is now used as a private residence.

References

School buildings on the National Register of Historic Places in Philadelphia
School buildings completed in 1867
Northeast Philadelphia